Kyle Konwea (born 30 March 1989) is a Swedish footballer who plays for Assyriska FF as a central defender.

Career
Kyle Konwea transferred from Assyriska FF to Siah Jamegan of the Persian Gulf Pro League on 11 December 2015.
On 14 March 2018 SJK announced that their contract with Konwea had been mutually terminated due to home-sickness.

Personal life
Konwea was born to a Nigerian father and Swedish mother. He has been approached by the Nigerian FA to represent Nigeria internationally.

References

External links

 

Living people
1989 births
Swedish footballers
Qviding FIF players
BK Häcken players
Assyriska FF players
IF Brommapojkarna players
Siah Jamegan players
Superettan players
Persian Gulf Pro League players
Swedish expatriate footballers
Swedish expatriate sportspeople in Iran
Expatriate footballers in Iran
Footballers from Gothenburg
Swedish people of Nigerian descent
Association football central defenders
Swedish expatriate sportspeople in Finland
Expatriate footballers in Finland